Aeria Games, formerly known as Aeria Games and Entertainment, was an online game publisher. The corporate headquarters was in Berlin, Germany.

Aeria Games was a subsidiary of ProSiebenSat.1 Media, which operated an Internet gaming portal for massively multiplayer online games. It focused on online games in multiple formats, client games, browser games, and mobile games. It published games for North America, South America and Europe.

History

Aeria Games was founded in Santa Clara, California, as Aeria Games & Entertainment. Two years later they opened their first international office in Berlin, Germany, which later became the company's headquarter. On January 5, the company acquired ijji, 2012.

The company also merged with Gamepot in late 2012.

In February 2014, all its worldwide PC games business including its subsidiary Aeria Games Europe GmbH were sold to ProSiebenSat.1 Media. In May 2016, Aeria Games merged with Gamigo and let go 100 of their formerly 260 employees in Berlin.

In February 2023, the gaming portal was closed down after its remaining games were transferred to other publishing companies.

Its games were free-to-play and used a micropayment system to generate revenue (in-game item malls and advertising).

Community
As of July 2012, after the acquisition of Ijji the community had over 40 million registered members.

Portal Closure 
On December 20, 2022, Aeria Games announced the transfer of all its current games (Aura Kingdom, Grand Fantasia and Shaiya) to other publishers. The publishing company additionally released information that the Aeria Games portal would be closing down in February of 2023.

Gamigo, the parent company of Aeria Games, subsequently confirmed on February 22, 2023, that the Aeria Games portal would be closing down on February 28, 2023.

Client games published
 Echo of Soul – Fantasy MMORPG
 Ironsight – FPS – Developed by Wiple Games
 Shaiya – Fantasy MMORPG
 Twin Saga – Anime MMORPG
 WolfTeam – Sci-Fi FPS

Browser games published (Aeria Browser)
 DDTank – Turn-based Action Game
 Wartune – Browser Based MMORTS/RPG

Mobile games published
 Goal 1 – Football Manager
 Heroes and Puzzles – Match 3 Mobile Game

Client games published via Aeria Ignite
 Digimon Masters  – Anime MMORPG

Games no longer published by Aeria Games
 Aura Kingdom – Anime-themed MMORPG
 Age of Conan: Unchained  – Fantasy MMORPG
 Alliance of Valiant Arms – Military FPS
 Armygeddon – Turn-Based Strategy
 Battlefield Heroes – Cartoon-styled TPS
 Battles and Monsters – Fantasy CCG RPG
 Bless – Fantasy MMORPG 
 Call of Gods – Browser Based MMORTS
 Chaos Heroes Online – MOBA
 Command & Conquer: Tiberium Alliances – Browser Based MMORTS
 Crystal Saga – Browser Based RPG
 Dawn of Gods  – Mobile Real Time Strategy
 DK Online – Fantasy MMORPG 
 Dragomon Hunter – Anime MMORPG
 Dragon Sky – Fantasy RPG
 Drakensang Online  – Action MMORPG
 Dreamlords – Strategy / Browser
 Dream of Mirror Online – Fantasy RPG
 Dynasty Warriors Online – Action MMORPG
 Eden Eternal – Anime-themed MMORPG
 Eden Eternal – Monster Arena – Fantasy RPG
 F.E.A.R. Online – Horror FPS
 Golden Age – Browser Based MMORTS
 Grand Fantasia – Anime-themed MMORPG
 GunZ: The Duel – Third Person Shooter
 Heroes of Gaia – Browser Based MMORTS
 Immortalis – Fantasy CCG RPG
 Kingdom Heroes – Fantasy RPG
 Kitsu Saga – Fantasy RPG
 Last Chaos – Fantasy RPG
 Latale – Fantasy RPG
 Lime Odyssey – Anime themed MMORPG 
 Lord of Ages – History-based Based MMORTS
 Lord of Ultima – Browser Based MMORTS
 Luminary:Rise of GoonZu – Fantasy RPG
 Maestia – Fantasy MMORPG
 Magimon – Fantasy CCG RPG
 Metal Assault – Platform Shooter
 Ministry of War – History-based MMORTS
 Monster Paradise – Fantasy CCG RPG
 Need for Speed: World – Action Driving
 Perfect World – Fantasy MMORPG (Spanish Only)
 Pi Story – Fantasy RPG
 Pirate Galaxy – Sci-fi browser MMORPG
 Pirate Maidens – Pirate CCG RPG
 Project Torque – Action Driving
 Ragnarok Online 2  – Fantasy MMORPG
 Runes of Magic – Fantasy MMORPG (Spanish, Portuguese, Turkish)
 S4 League – Anime FPS
 Scarlet Blade – Sci-Fi/Fantasy MMORPG
 Shin Megami Tensei: Imagine – Fantasy RPG
 Soldier Front – MMOFPS Game (rebrand of Special Force)
 Soldier Front 2 – MMOFPS Game (rebrand of Special Force 2)
 Star Supremacy – Sci-fi browser MMORTS
 Stone Age 2 – Fantasy RPG
 Stronghold Kingdoms  – Client Based MMORTS
 Tuff Tanks – Turned-Based Artillery Shooter
 Turf Battles – MMO PK (PVP)
 Twelve Sky – Martial Arts RPG
 Twelve Sky 2 – Martial Arts RPG

References

External links
 

Browser-based game websites
Companies based in Santa Clara, California
Companies based in Berlin
German companies established in 2006
Video game companies established in 2006
Video game companies of the United States
Video game websites
Video game companies of Germany